Deepankar (Deep) Medhi is an Indo-American computer scientist and inventor. He is on leave as Curators' Distinguished Professor in the department of computer science and electrical engineering at the University of Missouri–Kansas City. He is a fellow of IEEE.

Prior to joining the University of Missouri–Kansas City, he worked as a technical officer at AT&T Bell Laboratories, routing and designing teletraffic networks. While at AT&T Bell Laboratories, he co-invented the Facility Diverse Routing system.

He is currently working as a program director in the computer and network systems (CNS) division of the National Science Foundation (NSF) in the United States.

Birth and family
Deepankar Medhi was born in Guwahati in 1962. His father was statistician Jyotiprasad Medhi and his mother was Prity Medhi. His great-grandfather Kaliram Medhi is an Assamese writer.

Book
Network Routing: Algorithms, Protocols, and Architectures
Routing, Flow, and Capacity Design in Communication and Computer Networks

Honors and awards
Fellow, Institute of Electrical and Electronics Engineers (IEEE), 2018.
N.T. Veatch Award for Distinguished Research and Creative Activity, UMKC, 2012.
Chancellor's Award for Excellence in Graduate Mentoring, UMKC, 2012.
Curators' Distinguished Professor Designation by the Board of Curators of the University of Missouri System, 2011.
Kansas City Star's Tech 50 List, Summer 2002.

References

Indian scientists
Computer scientists
American scientists
Fellow Members of the IEEE
1962 births
Living people
University of Missouri–Kansas City faculty
Scientists from Guwahati